Karl Johnston (born August 11, 1967) is a Canadian constable and former ice hockey Defenseman who was an All-American for Lake Superior State and helped the Lakers win their first National Championship in 1988.

Career
Johnston began attending Lake Superior State University in 1987, joining the program just in time to help the Lakers win a national championship. Johnston finished second on the team in terms of scoring from the blueline and remained a mainstay on the defense for four years. His scoring output increased each year and LSSU made the NCAA Tournament each year he was with the club. As a senior, Johnston was named as an alternate captain and led the team to a program record 36 wins. Johnston was named to the All-American team and helped Lake State win the first conference championship in program history. Unfortunately, the top-seeded Lakers were upset in the national quarterfinals and Johnston's college career was over.

After graduating, Johnston signed with the New York Islanders organization and began his professional career with the Springfield Indians. He remained with the club for about a season and a half before being demoted to the ECHL. While he played well, Johnston realized that he needed another career path and retired after the 1994 season. He returned to Ontario and began working as a police officer in St. Thomas. He continued that work while making several additional appearances as a player for the remainder of the decade but eventually hung up his skates for good in 1999. In 2003 Johnston joined the Ontario Provincial Police and has worked as a constable ever since (as of 2021).

Statistics

Regular season and playoffs

Awards and honors

References

External links

1967 births
Living people
Ice hockey people from Ontario
Sportspeople from Windsor, Ontario
Canadian ice hockey defencemen
Lake Superior State Lakers men's ice hockey players
AHCA Division I men's ice hockey All-Americans
Springfield Indians players
Louisville Icehawks players
Raleigh IceCaps players
Knoxville Cherokees players
Amarillo Rattlers players
Wichita Thunder players
NCAA men's ice hockey national champions